Margovula marginata, common name the Chinese egg shell, is a species of sea snail, a marine gastropod mollusk in the family Ovulidae, the ovulids, cowry allies or false cowries.

Description
The size of an adult shell varies between 8 mm and 30 mm. The shell is rather thin, semitransparent, white, and encircled with an orange line at the margin. It is very obscurely decussated. Its interior is milkwhite. The length of the shell varies between 21 mm and 30 mm.

Distribution
This marine species occurs in the demersal zone of the Red Sea and in the Central Indo-West Pacific off the Philippines and China.

References

 Cate, C. N. 1973. A systematic revision of the recent Cypraeid family Ovulidae. Veliger 15 (supplement): 1–117
 Lorenz F. & Fehse D. (2009) The living Ovulidae. A manual of the families of allied cowries: Ovulidae, Pediculariidae and Eocypraeidae. Hackenheim: Conchbooks.

External links
 

Ovulidae
Gastropods described in 1828